is a 2003 Japanese direct-to-video crime action film directed by Masato Tanno.

Plot

Dai is the best fighter in the school. Every time he fights, Shiroishi is there with a big smile on his face. Dai thinks that Shiroishi is making fun of him, but in fact, he appreciates seeing all the violence that comes from fighting. Everybody bullies, makes fun of, and mocks Shiroishi, even the youngest on his karate course. But Shiroishi refuses to lose his temper and fight the others. However, a new student starts to make himself known by beating up all the students. In a fight with the new student, Dai ends up on the ground, completely destroyed. It seems that the new student will also beat up Shiroishi, but it seems that he will be the only one who will be able to provide a challenge.

Cast
 Chisato Amate : Satomi
 Kōji Chihara : Onizame
 Yuki Oikawa : Nao
 Nao Omori : Ichi
 Teah : Dai

See also

 2001 : Ichi the Killer (Koroshiya 1), by Takashi Miike

References

External links
 Review at Sancho does Asia
 Review at Hk Mania
 

2003 films
2003 crime thriller films
Live-action films based on manga
Japanese crime thriller films
Ichi the Killer
Japanese crime action films
2000s crime action films
Japanese direct-to-video films
2003 direct-to-video films
2000s Japanese films